Old Gutnish or Old Gotlandic was a North Germanic language spoken on the Baltic island of Gotland. It shows sufficient differences from the Old West Norse and  Old East Norse dialects that it is considered to be a separate branch. While vastly divergent from Old Gutnish and closer to Modern Swedish, a modern version of Gutnish is still spoken in some parts of Gotland and the adjoining island of Fårö. 

The root Gut is identical to Goth, and it is often remarked that the language has similarities with the Gothic language. These similarities have led scholars such as Elias Wessén and Dietrich Hofmann to suggest that it is most closely related to Gothic. The best known example of such a similarity is that Gothic and Gutnish called both adult and young sheep .

The Old Norse diphthong au (e.g. "eye") remained in Old Gutnish and Old West Norse, while in Old East Norse – except for peripheral dialects – it evolved into the monophthong ǿ, i.e. a long version of ø. Whereas Old West Norse had the ey diphthong and Old East Norse evolved the monophthong ǿ) Old Gutnish had oy.

Most of the corpus of Old Gutnish is found in the law of the Gutes (Old Gutnish: Guta lag) from the 13th century.

Language sample

Citation (from the Gutasaga):

With somewhat normalized orthography:

Translation in Icelandic:

Translation in English:

References

 Nationalencyklopedin
 Christine Peel. "Guta Saga - The History of the Gotlanders," Viking Society for Northern Research Text Series. Vol. XII. Viking Society for Northern Research, University College of London (1999).

Gutnish
Old Gutnish
Gotland